Kills is a mixtape by jj, released on Christmas Eve 2010.

Background
The mixtape was first mentioned by Elin from jj in a video interview for Swedish National Television while on tour in Europe. The title for the mixtape was though never revealed. First when the lead single from the mixtape, "Let Them", was released on October 12, the title of the mixtape was revealed to be Kills (also jj kills or jj fucking kills).

Being a mixtape, Kills was released completely for free, as a direct download, at Sincerely Yours website on Christmas Eve 2010. After just three days since being released, Kills had been downloaded more than 30,000 times, a number generated from only two of the several file hosting services. After one week of release, the number had increased to over 42,000 downloads, and as of January 21, 2011, Kills had been downloaded over 80,000 times from these two links alone. These links were then deleted.

Before the release, no other tracks besides from "Let Them" was confirmed to be on the mixtape, although several songs containing samples and jj vocals had been played on different dj-sets by members of jj. For example, the song "New Work" which has vocals by jj and contains samples from Jay-Z's Empire State of Mind and lyrics from Broder Daniel's "Work". As mentioned in an interview made as early as February 2010, the songs on the mixtape all "blended together" and created a completely seamless record.

On December 17, a poster and a trailer for Kills was published on Sincerely Yours website, then confirming that the release date will be December 24, 2010.

Music video
A music video for the first single from the mixtape, "Let Them", was released on December 20, 2010 on Sincerely Yours website. The video, directed by Olivia Kastebring, featured band members Joakim Benon and Elin Kastlander and was mainly location shot inside a church. This single was renamed, remixed, and rerecorded for the mixtape-version, changing the name from "Let Them" to "Kill Them".

Track listing

References

2010 mixtape albums
JJ (Swedish band) albums
Secretly Canadian albums
Albums free for download by copyright owner